Giorgi (Goga) Khachidze (born 9 February 1974) is a Georgian politician who served as the Minister of Environment Protection and Natural Resources of Georgia from 2008 to 2012.

Early years
Khachidze was born on 9 February 1974. In 1992 he entered Tbilisi State University graduating from Department of Biology, Physiology of Plants in 1997. Starting from 1993, he also studied Journalism at the same university obtaining his second Bachelor's degree in Journalism in 1997. From 1994 until 2002, he worked for the Channel 1 and 2 of the Georgian State Television, Rustavi 2, Ibervizia, 202, 105 broadcasting companies and the Press Service of the Ministry of Defense of Georgia.

Political career
In November 2002, Khachidze was elected head of United Democrats political party in Khashuri. From November 2003 through March 2004, he was the Deputy Head of Executive Power of Khashuri District. From March 2004 until December 2004, he was member of Parliament of Georgia. In December 2004, he was appointed State Attorney for Mtskheta-Mtianeti district by the President of Georgia. In March 2005, he was reassigned with the same duties to Samtskhe-Javakheti district where he remained until November 2008. On 1 November 2008 Khachidze was appointed Minister of Environment Protection and Natural Resources of Georgia. He resigned in August 2012 in order to run for the October 1 parliamentary election. He served in the Parliament for the United National Movement until quitting the party in May 2015.

Khachidze is fluent in Russian and English.

See also 
List of Georgians
Cabinet of Georgia

References

1974 births
Living people
Politicians from Tbilisi
Government ministers of Georgia (country)
Tbilisi State University alumni